California Hard is a jazz album by pianist and composer Dolo Coker, recorded in 1976. Two of the six pieces were written by Coker. The album was reissued as a CD in 1994, with one bonus track (a solo piano version of "Round Midnight").

Reception

AllMusic reviewer Scott Yanow awarded the album 3 stars and called it "A strong effort."

Track listing

"Jumping Jacks" (Coker) – 4:03
"Gone with the Wind" (Herb Magidson, Allie Wrubel) – 4:26
"Roots 4FB" (Mitchell) - 14:58
"Mr. Yohe" (Pepper) - 6:23
"Gone Again" (Gladys Hampton, Curtis Lewis, Curley Hamner) - 8:08
"Tale of Two Cities" (Coker) - 6:28
"'Round Midnight" (Thelonious Monk) (on CD reissue only; not on original LP) - 2:27

Personnel 
Recorded on December 27, 1976.

 Dolo Coker - piano
 Blue Mitchell - trumpet, flugelhorn
 Art Pepper - alto saxophone, tenor saxophone
 Leroy Vinnegar - bass guitar
 Frank Butler - drums

References

1977 albums
Dolo Coker albums
Xanadu Records albums
Albums produced by Don Schlitten